The Struben Dam Bird Sanctuary is located in Lynnwood Glen, Pretoria, in part of what was once the farm Hartebeestpoort 362 JR, which was owned by F.E.B. Struben.

Struben Dam 
The dam was built in the Waterkloof Spruit and contains 108,000 m³. The dam wall is around 6 m high.

The precise age of the original dam is unknown, but the dam is estimated to have been built from the 1940s to the 1960s. Maps from 1929 don't show the dam.

The dam wall was upgraded in September 1984, and since 1985 it has been used for flood control as well.

Fauna 
Bird life is abundant, and a wide variety of fish swim in the reservoir, including banded tilapia, African sharptooth catfish, Canary kurper, carp, and Micropterus.

Flora 
The biome near Struben Dam is bakenveld, a transitional habitat between grassland and bushveld. There are also marsh and shoreline areas under the dam wall. River bushwillow, sweet thorn, hook-thorn, and white stinkwood are the main trees found in the reserve.

Amenities 
The reserve is ideal for walking, birdwatching, and picnics. There are bathrooms and large lawns on which to relax. The dam is used for fishing. No campfires are allowed.

Hours 
Summer (September - April): 06:00 - 18:00

Winter (May - August): 06:00 - 18:00

Sources 
 Struben Dam Bird Sanctuary from www.tshwane.gov.za. Accessed on 25 June 2014.

References 

Nature reserves in South Africa
Pretoria